The Apes (sometimes just Apes) are a noisy, guitarless garage rock foursome from Washington, D.C.  The band formed in 1999 with the lineup of singer Paul Weil, keyboard player Amanda Kleinman (an Arts College advisor by day), bassist Erick Jackson, and drummer Jeff Schmid.  They released their first EP themselves, two albums on the New York label Frenchkiss, and an EP on Planaria Records before moving to San Francisco's Birdman Records which released an EP and the band's third full-length album.

The band has seen its three instrumentalists remain a constant while three different men have filled the shoes of lead singer.  Paul Weil left the band and was replaced by Joe Halladay, and in 2006 Halladay left the band and was replaced by the visual artist Breck Brunson, whose first recorded tracks appeared on a CD-R the band sold during its 2006 U.S. tour in support of Liars.  The band's fourth full-length album, titled Ghost Games, was released in early 2008 on Gypsy Eyes Records. In 2010, three of the band members moved to Heavy Breathing.

The band members are sometimes known by the pseudonyms Lucius Twilight (Brunson), Jackie Magik (Jackson), Majestic Ape (Kleinman), Count 101 (Weil), and Ronald Wolf (Schmid).

Discography

References

External links 
 
MySpace page

American art rock groups
American noise rock music groups
Musical groups from Washington, D.C.
Frenchkiss Records artists
Birdman Records artists